The 2017 Division 1, part of the 2017 Swedish football season is the 12th season of Sweden's third-tier football league in its current format. The 2017 fixtures were released in December 2016. The season started on 13 April 2017 and will end on 4 November 2017.

Teams
28 teams contest the league divided into two divisions, Norra and Södra. 18 returning from the 2016 season, three relegated from Superettan and seven promoted from Division 2. The champion of each division will qualify directly for promotion to Superettan, the two runners-up has to play a play-off against the thirteenth and fourteenth team from Superettan to decide who will play in Superettan 2018. The bottom three teams in each division will qualify directly for relegation to Division 2.

Stadia and locations

Norra

Södra

 1 Correct as of end of 2017 season

League tables

Norra

Södra

References

Swedish Football Division 1 seasons
3
Sweden